The Fay Islands are part of the Sverdrup Islands in Qikiqtaaluk Region, Nunavut, Canada. Located in the Arctic Ocean, they are also members of the Queen Elizabeth Islands and Arctic Archipelago. They lie within the Sverdrup Channel between Meighen Island and the west coast of Axel Heiberg Island. Peary Channel and Amund Ringnes Island are to the south. The Fay Islands are four very small islands, on occasion mistaken as sediment-loaded glaciers.

References

External links
 Fay Islands in the Atlas of Canada - Toporama; Natural Resources Canada
 The Papers of Samuel P. Fay at Dartmouth College Library

Islands of the Queen Elizabeth Islands
Sverdrup Islands
Uninhabited islands of Qikiqtaaluk Region